Jacqueline Meißner (born 4 February 1994) is a German footballer who plays as a right-back. She made three appearances for the Germany national team from 2016 to 2018.

References

External links
 

1994 births
Living people
German women's footballers
Women's association football fullbacks
Germany women's international footballers
SGS Essen players
Footballers from Dortmund